Shane Pryce (born 18 August 1973 in Australia) is an Australian retired soccer player and coach, who last coached for Perth side Inglewood United FC in 2012.

Career

Pryce started his career with Adamstown Rosebud, which he said "was the old school of train hard, play hard, drink hard". In 2000, he signed for Perth Glory due to Newcastle Breakers' financial problems, transitioning from a semi-professional to a full-time team. After playing professionally in the Singaporean S.League, Pryce had a chance to join Brisbane Roar in the newly formed A-League, but the move did not happen because of injury.

References

External links
 

Australian soccer players
Living people
Association football defenders
1973 births
Newcastle Breakers FC players
Perth Glory FC players